Max Roach and the Boston Percussion Ensemble is a live album by American jazz drummer Max Roach featuring tracks recorded at the Music Inn in Lenox, Massachusetts in 1958 and released on the EmArcy label.

Track listing
All compositions by Harold Faberman.

 "Variations on a Familiar Theme"- 6:42
 "Evolution" - 18:05 
 "The Music Inn Suite: The Music Inn #1" - 0:45 
 "The Music Inn Suite: The Poodle Tower" - 2:51 
 "The Music Inn Suite: Soliloquy #1" - 0:34 
 "The Music Inn Suite: Potting Shed Passacaglia" - 3:28 
 "The Music Inn Suite: Soliloquy #2" - 1:10 
 "The Music Inn Suite: Stephanie B." - 2:16 
 "The Music Inn Suite: Duo Concertante" - 2:16 
 "The Music Inn Suite: The Music Inn #2" - 1:10

Personnel 
Max Roach - drums
Al Portch - French horn
Irving Farberman, Everette Firth, Lloyd McCausland, Arthur Press, Charles Smith, Harold Thompson, Walter Tokarczyk - percussion
Corinne Curry - soprano voice
Harold Faberman - conductor, musical director

References 

1958 live albums
Max Roach live albums
EmArcy Records live albums